Julianus may refer to:

 Julianus (frog), a genus of frogs in the family Hylidae
 Flavius Claudius Julianus (331–363), Roman emperor from 361 to 363 best known as Julian
 Saint Julianus (disambiguation), several Roman-era Christian saints
 Julianus (consul) (fl. 130 AD), Roman senator
 Julius Julianus (fl. 315–325 AD), Roman politician
 Lucius Julius Julianus, Roman military officer
 Lucius Julius Vehilius Gratus Julianus, Roman military officer

See also

 Julian (disambiguation)